Lorenz Schmidt or Lorentz Schmidt (1884 - 1952) was a prominent architect in Kansas. He designed the Fresh Air Baby Camp and Woolf Brothers Clothing Company buildings, both listed on the National Register of Historic Places. He was made a fellow of the American Institute of Architects. His firm was Lorentz Schmidt & Co.

He graduated from the University of Illinois in 1913.

Harry Overend worked for his firm.

Work
Fresh Air Baby Camp
 Woolf Brothers Clothing Company
Cooper Grade School (1939)
Irving Elementary (1941)
Hamilton Junior High
W.O. Van Arsdale House at 201 N. Broadview. NRHP listed.
Wichita East High School (built 1922 - 1924)
Sandra Theatre (1939) Demolished.
Old Science Hall (1925) at Bethel College in North Newton, Kansas
C.M. Jackman House at 158 N Roosevelt NRHP listed
Powell House 330 North Crest Way
Sunnyside School, 3003 E Kellog
Clyde School 620 Broadway Street in Clyde, Kansas NRHP listed
McKinley School, part of the McKinley Residential Historic District in Newton, Kansas

References

1884 births
1952 deaths
American architects
University of Illinois alumni
Architects from Kansas
Fellows of the American Institute of Architects